William Joseph Stewart (September 20, 1895 – February 18, 1964) was an American coach and sports official who was a referee in the National Hockey League (NHL) and an umpire in Major League Baseball (MLB). In 1938, as head coach of the Chicago Black Hawks, he led the team to a championship, becoming the first U.S.-born coach to win the Stanley Cup. He is an inductee of the United States Hockey Hall of Fame.

Early years
Born in Fitchburg, Massachusetts, Stewart  grew up in Boston, Massachusetts, and competed in baseball, hockey, track, and wrestling in high school.

Sports career

Baseball player, manager, and scout
In 1913, Stewart became a minor league baseball player with Worcester in the New England League, and in 1917 while with Montreal he was the first International League player to enlist for World War I service, joining the United States Navy. In these pre-war seasons, he primarily played as an outfielder.

After the war, Stewart was signed by the Chicago White Sox in December 1918, but he suffered an arm injury falling down a flight of stairs while working as a census taker, and was sent to the minor leagues in May 1919. As he was, apparently, on a major league roster yet never appeared in a major league game, Stewart is an example of a "phantom ballplayer."

In the 1920s, Stewart played parts of several seasons in the minor leagues, including three seasons as a pitcher: 1922 in Syracuse, New York, 1927 in Nashua, New Hampshire, and 1928 in Waterbury, Connecticut.

Stewart was also a manager during three seasons: 1927 in Nashua, 1928 in Waterbury, and 1931 in Springfield, Massachusetts. He was also a scout for the Boston Red Sox during 1926–27.

In 1929, he played summer baseball for Falmouth in the Cape Cod Baseball League. A steady pitcher, he was described as "making up for his lack of speed with plenty of control and lots of headwork."

Ice hockey coach and referee
During baseball offseasons in the 1910s and 1920s, Stewart generally coached Boston-area college and high school hockey teams.

In 1928, Stewart became the NHL's first U.S.-born referee, and served in that capacity until 1941, excepting his two seasons as coach of the Chicago Black Hawks; 1937–38 (when the team won the Stanley Cup) and 1938–39.

Coaching record

Baseball umpire
In 1930, Stewart became an umpire in the Eastern League, and later officiated in the International League and New York–Pennsylvania League.

Stewart was an umpire in the National League (NL) from 1933 to 1954, and officiated in four World Series (1937, 1943, 1948, 1953) and four All-Star Games (1936, 1940, 1948, 1954), calling balls and strikes for the last contest.

During the 1948 World Series, Stewart made a controversial call in Game 1, which received significant press coverage. In a scoreless game in the bottom of the eighth inning. Boston Braves' pinch runner Phil Masi was on second base with one out. Cleveland Indians' pitcher Bob Feller attempted to pick off Masi at second base, and shortstop Lou Boudreau appeared to tag Masi out; however, Stewart called Masi safe. Masi subsequently scored the only run of the game, giving the Braves a win in the first game of the series. Stewart's ruling was hotly debated in the media and by fans, especially after Associated Press photographs of the play were published. Despite losing the first game, Cleveland would go on to win the series in six games. Upon his death in 1990, Masi's will revealed that he really was out on the play.

Stewart worked 714 consecutive games from the time he entered the NL until September 1938, when he was stricken with appendicitis. He resigned from the NL umpiring staff in January 1955 after not being promoted to league supervisor, a position he claimed had been promised him by commissioner Ford Frick when he had been NL president; new league president Warren Giles instead announced that the position would not be filled.

Later years
After retiring as an umpire, Stewart continued to work as a scout for the Cleveland Indians and Washington Senators.

Stewart coached the U.S. men's national hockey team in 1957, posting a 23–3–1 record, but the team was barred by the U.S. State Department from participating in the World Championships following the Soviet invasion of Hungary.

In February 1964, Stewart died at the Veterans Administration Hospital near his home in the Jamaica Plain section of Boston, after suffering a stroke two weeks earlier.

Stewart was inducted into the United States Hockey Hall of Fame in 1982. His grandson Paul became an NHL player and referee and like his grandfather was elected to the United States Hockey Hall of Fame in 2018.

References

Further reading

External links
Biography at the U.S. Hockey Hall of Fame
Umpiring record at Retrosheet

1890s births
1964 deaths
American ice hockey coaches
American ice hockey officials
United States Navy personnel of World War I
American referees and umpires
Baltimore Orioles (IL) players
Boston Red Sox scouts
Cape Cod Baseball League players (pre-modern era)
Chambersburg Maroons players
Chicago Blackhawks coaches
Cleveland Indians scouts
Falmouth Commodores players
Harrisburg Islanders players
Ice hockey people from Massachusetts
Louisville Colonels (minor league) players
Major League Baseball umpires
Montreal Royals players
Nashville Vols players
Nashua Millionaires players
National Hockey League officials
Newark Bears (IL) players
Sportspeople from Fitchburg, Massachusetts
St. Joseph Saints players
Sportspeople from Boston
Stanley Cup champions
Stanley Cup championship-winning head coaches
Syracuse Stars (AA) players
Troy Trojans (minor league) players
United States Hockey Hall of Fame inductees
United States Navy sailors
Washington Senators (1901–60) scouts
Worcester Busters players
People from Jamaica Plain
Ice hockey players from Massachusetts